Results from the 2001 Buenos Aires Grand Prix held at Buenos Aires on June 17, 2001, in the Autódromo Oscar Alfredo Gálvez.

Classification 

2001
2001 in Argentine motorsport
2001 in motorsport
June 2001 sports events in South America